The following is a list of recurring Saturday Night Live characters and sketches introduced between October 11, 1986, and May 23, 1987, the twelfth season of SNL.

Marge Keister
A Jan Hooks sketch. Debuted October 11, 1986.

Appearances

The Church Lady

Dana Carvey plays a "holier-than-thou" talk show host. Debuted October 11, 1986.

Church Chat

Additional appearances

Church Potluck- December 6, 1986
Christmas Eve- December 17, 1988
The '90s- January 13, 1990
Weekend Update- November 5, 2016

Mr. Subliminal
Played by Kevin Nealon, he was originally an advertising executive (named Phil Maloney) who used subliminal messages to influence people. His appearances on Update utilized the subliminal technique (i.e. saying things rapidly and under his breath, in between sentences) to reveal what he is really thinking.  For example, in an editorial on the 1994 caning of Michael Fay, he stated that:
"...the boy admitted to spray painting cars but he's only eighteen and young people often do stupid and impulsive things they later regret (Shannen Doherty). I happen to think [pause] that everyone's entitled to one mistake (Euro Disney). And I'm not saying there aren't [pause] those who I'd love to see get a good flogging (Urkel), it's just that [pause] I'm afraid we've become so insensitive that we've learned to accept the idea of a man's beating in public (Pee Wee Herman)."
Debuted October 11, 1986.

Derek Stevens ("She choppin’ broccoli...")
An English singer/songwriter (played by Dana Carvey) is meeting with his record producers to go over his demo, which they soon discover he has failed to record. He insists, however, that he has written songs and he can play the songs for them live, and when they ask him to do so, he quickly makes up a song called "The Lady I Know". He then sits at the piano and begins sloppily faking his way through the song, which ultimately becomes an endless refrain of the chorus, "Choppin' broccoli" in various vocal styles and intonations. Upon hearing it, the producers appear to be awestruck by his lyrics, and are ecstatic about recording the song. Debuted October 11, 1986.

This song was originally in a Dana Carvey stand-up comedy routine about the vapidness of popular music.

Stevens returns in a later sketch, in which his producers try to convince him that his premature death might help the sales of his album.  A fearful Stevens responds by hyping a new song, with the same tune as "The Lady I Know", but featuring different, though equally repetitive, lyrics and a similar endless refrain ("My pretty little lady!  My pretty little gir-rl!")  The producers are unimpressed.

Stevens appeared once more on SNL's 40th Anniversary Special in 2015, singing "Choppin' Broccoli".

Appearances

The Sweeney Sisters
The Sweeney Sisters are a duo of party singers, Candy Sweeney (played by Jan Hooks) and her sister Liz (played by Nora Dunn). They normally sing cover medleys of pop standards in very high-pitched voices, a la Nick the Lounge Singer. Their medleys always include the first two lines of "The Trolley Song" ("Clang, clang, clang went the trolley...") about two-thirds of the way through, followed by a string of scatting.  In these medleys the last word of one song often segues into the first word of the next. The sisters are usually seen performing at various U.S. hotel lounges, and their performances usually begin with "You must have pressed 'L' for 'lobby'!  Come, join us." They were the opening act at the 40th Primetime Emmy Awards in 1988. Candy and Liz have a sister (a former member of the group), Audrey, who was played by Mary Tyler Moore. The Sweeneys' accompanist, Skip St.Thomas, was played by composer Marc Shaiman.  Debuted October 18, 1986.

Appearances

Instant Coffee with Bill Smith
A Kevin Nealon sketch. Debuted October 18, 1986.

The Two Sammies
A Dana Carvey and Kevin Nealon sketch. Debuted November 8, 1986.

Miss Connie's Fable Nook
A Jan Hooks, Dana Carvey, Dennis Miller and Kevin Nealon sketch. Debuted November 8, 1986.

The Jungle Room
A Phil Hartman and Jon Lovitz sketch.

Appearances

Ching Chang
Dana Carvey played the character Ching Chang, a typical Asian-American stereotype whose only goal in life is to put his chickens in their own show on Broadway. Debuted November 15, 1986.

Appearances

The NFL Today
A parody of The NFL Today, with Phil Hartman impersonating Jimmy "The Greek" Snyder and Kevin Nealon impersonating Brent Musburger.

Appearances

Mace
A Phil Hartman sketch. Debuted January 24, 1987.

Appearances

Nightline
A parody of the late-night news program Nightline, with Dana Carvey impersonating its host Ted Koppel.

Appearances

Discover with Peter Graves
Phil Hartman impersonates actor Peter Graves in this series of sketches. It parodies actors hosting documentary series, portraying Graves as not being able to fully understand or comprehend the show's topics.

Appearances

President Dexter
A Charlton Heston sketch. Debuted March 28, 1987.

References 

Lists of recurring Saturday Night Live characters and sketches
Saturday Night Live
Saturday Night Live
Saturday Night Live in the 1980s